Manjalamkuzhi Ali is an Indian politician and previous minister in the Government of Kerala. He was elected to Kerala Legislative Assembly from Perinthalmanna constituency in 2016.

An entrepreneur-turned-politician, Ali left the LDF and joined Indian Union Muslim League on the eve of the 2011 Kerala Legislative Assembly election. He was elected as an MLA from Perinthalmanna in Malappuram district. In the previous two elections held in 2001 and 2006, he was elected to the assembly from Mankada segment as an LDF independent. He is a leader of Indian Union Muslim League.

Biography
Manjalamkuzhi Ali, was born on 1 January 1952, as the 5th child of 10 to Manjalamkuzhi Mohammed Alias Manu and Perincheeri Kunhaysha.

Married to APM Raziya, D/o late C P Kunjalikutty Keyi (Ex MLA). He is the chairman of the GEMS Arts and Science college, Ramapuram, Malappuram district. He is the producer of some Malayalam movies, including The King.

He was Chairman, Mahakavi Moyinkutty Vaidyar Smaraka Trust (1996-2001); Director, KSFDC (1996-01); Director, NORKA-ROOTS  (2006–11). He acted in a new film 'Vikruthikootam'.

His elder son Amjad Ali (aged 33 yrs.) died on 12 March 2014 in Dubai due to heart attack.

Movies

As actor
Radha Madhavam 
Chanakyan

Trivia
Ali and M. K. Muneer contested elections against each other at Mankada and Ali defeated Muneer. They both served as State Ministers of the same Government later.

References

Living people
Malayali politicians
People from Malappuram district
Indian Union Muslim League politicians
1952 births
Kerala MLAs 2001–2006
Kerala MLAs 2006–2011
Kerala MLAs 2016–2021
Kerala MLAs 2011–2016